Llangynwyd railway station is on the Maesteg Line in Bridgend County Borough, Wales. It was closed to regular passenger trains on 22 June 1970 but continued to be served by school trains until 15 July 1970, The line through the station reopened in 1992 by British Rail.

References

Disused railway stations in Bridgend County Borough
Former Great Western Railway stations
Railway stations in Great Britain opened in 1864
Railway stations in Great Britain closed in 1917
Railway stations in Great Britain opened in 1919
Railway stations in Great Britain closed in 1970
Beeching closures in Wales
1864 establishments in Wales
1970 disestablishments in Wales